Keelathaniyam is a village in Pudukkottai District in the Indian state of Tamil Nadu. The panchayat is part of the Thirumayam Assembly and the Sivaganga Lok Sabha constituency. It has a total of seven wards. Totally seven members are elected from this wards.  According to the 2011 Census the population of keelathaniyam is 2168. In this female are 1077 and male are 1091.

Basic Amenities 
The information about basic amenities is as follows:

Small villages 
List of small villages in this panchayat is as follows:
# Rengapuram
 Uppiliyapatti
 V. Pudhur
 Ramalingapuram
 Keelathaniyam
 Ammankoilpatti
 Aadhi colony
 Idaiyapatti
 Sampappatti

References

Villages in Pudukkottai district